Sergeant Berry is a 1938 German comedy western film directed by Herbert Selpin and starring Hans Albers, Toni von Bukovics and Peter Voß. A tough Chicago policeman is sent to the Mexican–American border on a dangerous mission. It was based on a novel by Robert Arden.

The film's sets were designed by the art director Paul Markwitz and Fritz Maurischat.

Cast

Hans Albers as Sergeant Mecki Berry
Toni von Bukovics as Berry's mother
Peter Voß as Oberst Turner
Edwin Jürgensen as Madison
Gerd Höst as Amely Madison
Alexander Golling as Evans
Alexander Engel as Gomez
Herbert Hübner as Don Antonio de Garcia
Herma Relin as Ramona
Werner Scharf as Don José
Erich Ziegel as Consul Erasmus Smith
Hanni Weisse as the consul's wife
Hans Stiebner as Carlo
Kurt Seifert as Chief of Police Alcalde
Hertha von Walther as Juanita
Erich Dunskus as ein Grenzpolizeiinspektor
Annemarie Schreiner as Zofe Ramonas
Toni Färber as US-Grenzbeamter
Friedrich Gnaß as Chicago-Gangsterboss Duffy
Fred Goebel as Hotel Porter
Reginald Pasch as Schmuggler Blandy
Louis Ralph as  Gangster
Arthur Reinhardt as Schmuggler Big
Arnulf Schröder as Pedro, Alcaldes Assistant
Heinz Wemper as the chief of the gangster
Manfred Meurer as Don Antonios Angestellter
Helmuth Heyne as ein Raufbold
Jac Diehl as ein Hotelgast
Mohamed Husen as the Chicago nightclub patron
Louis Brody as Berry's neighbor

References

Bibliography
 Hull, David Stewart. Film in the Third Reich: a study of the German cinema, 1933–1945. University of California Press, 1969.

External links

1938 films
German adventure comedy films
German Western (genre) comedy films
1930s Western (genre) comedy films
1930s German-language films
Films directed by Herbert Selpin
Films set in Chicago
Films set in Mexico
Films set in the United States
Films based on German novels
Films of Nazi Germany
Tobis Film films
German black-and-white films
1930s adventure comedy films
1938 comedy films
1930s German films